Philippine President Benigno Aquino III has made political position on many national issues.

Energy policy

Nuclear energy

Aquino is not keen on utilizing nuclear energy as a remedy to a power shortage Mindanao experienced in the second quarter of 2012. Aquino said that while he is open to adopt nuclear energy he is more inclined to tap "other sources of energy that have less impact – or potential negative impact – that are available to us. While Aquino remained open to nuclear energy he has publicly expressed his opposition to plans to revive the moth-balled Bataan Nuclear Power Plant.

Environmental policy
During an interview in CNN in November 2013, Aquino said that countries "contributing immensely to the global warning" have a moral responsibility to contribute to end climate change.

Financial policy

Priority Development Assistance Fund
Following the Priority Development Assistance Fund scam, Aquino initially insisted that the abolition of the Priority Development Assistance Fund or PDAF is unnecessary. Aquino later detracted from his earlier statement and vowed to abolish the fund and replace it with a new system.

Social policy

Abortion and reproductive health
Despite his support for the Reproductive Health Bill, which was perceived by critics as a precedent to a law on legalizing abortion, Aquino insists that he is against the legalization of abortion.

Aquino supported the passing of the Reproductive Health Bill. He believes on the responsibility of the state to inform couples on their right to plan their family.

Foreign land ownership
Aquino is against revising the constitution to allow full land ownership by foreigners. Aquino remains firm in keeping the 60/40 foreign ownership law which guarantees Filipinos majority share on land ownership.

Gay marriage
Aquino has yet to make a firm stance on gay marriage. During a forum at the Sofitel Philippine Plaza in December 2013, Aquino was inquired on his view on gay marriage and if he was in favor of its legalization. Aquino initially refused to answer the question but later clarified his views on the issue. He said that while he believes on universal human rights he is undecided on the legalization of gay marriage. Aquino expressed some concerns that legalization of gay marriage may follow legalization of abortion. He said that the issue must first be viewed on a "child's perspective".He expressed concerns that children adopted by gay marriage couples may experience gender confusion.

Security policy

Gun ownership
Aquino, a gun enthusiast himself, is against the imposition of a total gun ban in the country. He believes in the right to bear arms. On May 29, 2013, Aquino signed the Republic Act No. 10591, an "Act Providing for a Comprehensive Law on Firearms and Ammunition and Providing Penalties for Violations thereof", providing a new set of standards on obtaining a license to bear firearms.

Height restriction on security personnel
Aquino vetoed a bill that would have remove height restrictions on police, fire and jail personnel. Aquino found the bill unnecessary as a waiver can be given to applicants under certain conditions. Aquino insists that jail personnel in particular "must possess the necessary physical attributes to perform their functions effectively".

Foreign policy

China
Aquino has made statements critical to China indirectly and directly. At the 2013 ASEAN summit in Brunei, He accused China of being uncooperative after it rejected to participate in a case filed by the Philippines to the United Nations tribunal. Aqunio also said that he is open of an idea of a joint development in the South China Sea but remained cautious and insisted that a joint development would be under Philippine law.

Aquino supports a diplomatic solution to the South China Sea dispute. He reiterated that ASEAN members should draft the Code of Conduct of Parties in the West Philippine Sea before commencing ASEAN-China talks.

Japan
Aquino supported a proposal to allow Japanese troops access to Philippine military bases along with another proposal to give American troops greater access to Philippine military installation. Aquino views these proposals as an avenue to build a credible alliance with Japan and the United States.

See also
Manila hostage crisis
Protests against Bongbong Marcos
Angry German Kid
September 11 attacks
Noynoying
Mob rule
2001 Philippine general election
2004 Philippine presidential election
1986 Philippine presidential election
1946 Philippine presidential election
1961 Philippine presidential election
2016 Philippine presidential election
Martial law
Yellow ribbon
Political demonstration
Revolution
People power
Coup d'état
Protest
Riot
Police brutality
Fist
Jejomar Binay 2016 presidential campaign
Mar Roxas 2016 presidential campaign
Adolf Hitler's cult of personality
Ferdinand Marcos's cult of personality
Protests against Donald Trump
Protests against Rodrigo Duterte
Trumpism
Proclamation No. 1081
1972 Philippines Martial law under Ferdinand Marcos
1986 Philippines EDSA People Power Revolution
2001 Philippines EDSA People Power Revolution
1989 Davao hostage crisis
War on drugs
War on terror
Rodrigo Duterte 2016 presidential campaign
Diehard Duterte Supporters
Philippines
Flag of the Philippines
Political positions of Leni Robredo
Political positions of Mar Roxas
Political positions of Rodrigo Duterte

References

Benigno Aquino III
Political positions of Philippine politicians